This is the results breakdown of the local elections held in Castilla–La Mancha on 24 May 2015. The following tables show detailed results in the autonomous community's most populous municipalities, sorted alphabetically.

Opinion polls

Overall

City control
The following table lists party control in the most populous municipalities, including provincial capitals (shown in bold). Gains for a party are displayed with the cell's background shaded in that party's colour.

Municipalities

Albacete
Population: 172,487

Ciudad Real
Population: 74,960

Cuenca
Population: 55,738

Guadalajara
Population: 83,720

Talavera de la Reina
Population: 86,779

Toledo
Population: 83,334

See also
2015 Castilian-Manchegan regional election

References

Castilla-La Mancha
2015